686 Gersuind is a minor planet orbiting the Sun that was discovered by German astronomer August Kopff on 15 August 1909 from Heidelberg. It was named after a character in Gerhart Hauptmann's play Gersuind.

This object is the namesake of a family of 40–207 asteroids that share similar spectral properties and orbital elements; hence they may have arisen from the same collisional event. All members have a relatively high orbital inclination.

References

External links 
 
 

000686
Discoveries by August Kopff
Named minor planets
000686
19090815